Megalogomphus is a genus of dragonflies belonging to the family Gomphidae.

The species of this genus are found in Southeastern Asia.

Species:

Heterogomphus robustus 
Heterogomphus smithii 
Megalogomphus bicornutus 
Megalogomphus ceylonicus 
Megalogomphus cochinchinensis 
Megalogomphus flavicolor 
Megalogomphus hannyngtoni 
Megalogomphus icterops 
Megalogomphus junghuhni 
Megalogomphus smithii 
Megalogomphus sommeri 
Megalogomphus sumatranus 
Megalogomphus superbus

References

Gomphidae